Holmes is an unincorporated community in Lake Township, Wright County, Iowa, United States.

History
Founded in the 1800s, Holmes' population was 62 in 1902, and 154 in 1925.

Education
Holmes is a part of the Clarion–Goldfield–Dows Community School District. It was in the Clarion–Goldfield Community School District, until July 1, 2014, when it merged into the current district.

References

Unincorporated communities in Wright County, Iowa
Unincorporated communities in Iowa